Esfezar (also Romanized as Esfezār, Esfazār, and Asafzar; also known as Asfarār, Asferār, Esferār, and Isfizār) is a village in Mud Rural District, Mud District, Sarbisheh County, South Khorasan Province, Iran. At the 2006 census, its population was 460, in 131 families.

History
In 1383, Timur the conqueror captured Esfezar after it had revolted. Because it had interrupted his heavily planned invasion of Georgia, he ordered that all survivors of the Siege be cemented into the walls of the city. Though it is likely that their bodies were later removed by Timur himself. This could also be a myth, to try and demonize Timur.

References 

Populated places in Sarbisheh County